The Military ranks of Kyrgyzstan are the military insignia used by the Armed Forces of the Republic of Kyrgyzstan. Kyrgyzstan is a landlocked country, and does therefore not possess a navy. Being a former Soviet state, Kyrgyzstan shares a rank structure similar to that of Russia.

Commissioned officer ranks
The rank insignia of commissioned officers.

Other ranks
The rank insignia of non-commissioned officers and enlisted personnel.

References

External links
 

Kyrgyzstan
Military of Kyrgyzstan